A licentiate (abbreviated Lic.) is an academic degree present in many countries, representing different educational levels.
It may be similar to a master's degree when issued by pontifical universities and other universities in Europe, Latin America, and Syria.

The term is also used for a person who holds this degree.

Etymology
The term derives from Latin licentia, "freedom" (from Latin licēre, "to be allowed"), which is applied in the phrases licentia docendi (also licentia doctorandi), meaning "permission to teach", and licentia ad practicandum (also licentia practicandi), meaning "permission to practice", signifying someone who holds a certificate of competence to practise a profession.

History 

The Gregorian Reform of the Catholic Church led to an increased focus on the liberal arts in episcopal schools during the 11th and 12th centuries, with Pope Gregory VII ordering all bishops to make provisions for the teaching of liberal arts. Chancellors and scholasters exercised a high degree of control over who could teach within their locus magisterii, or area of teaching authority. Throughout the 12th century, the degree of their control tightened to such an extent that they had essential monopolies over all teachers in their dioceses, and teachers were barred from acting as instructors without the explicit authorization of their scholasters. Conflicts sometimes arose between the scholasters and local independent educators who operated educational facilities without their permission, and chancellors often demanded expensive gifts before granting a license to teach. In response to these escalating abuses of power, Pope Alexander III demanded that a free licentia docendi should be granted to anyone deemed qualified to teach. This allowed the Church to progressively centralize its educational control, reducing the power of individual scholasters.

Originally, for the student in the medieval university the licentia docendi was of a somewhat different nature than the academic degrees of bachelor, master or doctor. The latter essentially indicated the rank of seniority in the various faculties (arts, theology, law, medicine), whereas the licentia was literally the licence to teach. It was awarded not by the university but by the church, embodied in the chancellor of the diocese in which the university was located. The licentia would only be awarded however upon recommendation by the university, initially shortly before the candidate would be awarded the final degree of master or doctor, the requirements for which beyond having been awarded the licentia were only of a ceremonial nature.

Over time however, this distinction in nature between the licentia on the one hand and the bachelor, master and doctor degrees on the other began to fade. In the continental European universities the licentia became an academic degree intermediate between the bachelor's degree on the one hand and the master's or doctor's degree on the other, in particular in the higher faculties. Moreover, the costs for obtaining the doctorate could be significant. As a result, most students not intending an academic career would forgo the doctorate, and as a result the licentiate became the common final degree.

Notable exceptions to this development were the universities of Oxford and Cambridge, and the universities modelled after them. As their locations were not the seats of bishops, the granting of the licentia docendi was by proxy, and its significance faded away.

Regional variations

Argentina 
In Argentina, the Licentiate degree (Spanish: Licenciatura), by which one becomes a licenciado, is a four to six-year degree with a required final thesis defence. Upon competition of the licentiate degree the student may be eligible to apply for a postgraduate degree such as a master or doctorate.

Australia 
Currently the only institutions in Australia to grant licentiates, apart from theological colleges, are the Australian Music Examinations Board and St Cecilia School of Music, which confer licentiate diplomas. The status of this award is similar to that of an Australian diploma—currently one year of post-secondary education—and so it is a lesser award than a degree, although this award can usually take two or more years to complete due to its high standard. Similarly, for theological colleges in former times, the licentiate was a specific post graduate award, analogous to a current graduate diploma. It was used specifically because some theological colleges did not enjoy university status, and could not award degrees such as baccalaureates, masters and doctorates. Though this was never the case in Catholic Colleges where the Licentiate cannot be earned until one has completed 7 years of study (5 for the baccalaureate and 2 for the licentiate).  In such an instance, it sits well above the level of graduate diploma between that of master's and doctorate.

The Catholic Institute of Sydney is a Pontifical Faculty and as such offers the Licentiate of Sacred Theology which ranks above a master's degree and can only be earned after seven years of study (five years for the S.T.B.; two years for the S.T.L.). The licentiate is part of the three cycles of theological education in the Roman Catholic Church that was instituted in 1931: baccalaureate (STB); licentiate (STL) and doctorate (STD). It is the licentiate that licences faculty to teach in seminaries. See John Paul II's apostolic constitution, Sapientia Christiana.

Belgium 
At Belgian universities, a person titled Licentiate (or Licentiaat in Dutch or Licencié in French, abbreviated lic.) holds the equivalent education of a Master's degree. A female Licentiate was called Licentiate in Dutch and Licenciée in French. The years spent to obtain the degree of Licentiate were called Licentiaat or Licentie in Dutch and Licence in French. It was the second level of university study, after that of Candidate (or Kandidaat in Dutch or Candidat in French, abbreviated cand.). A female Candidate was called Kandidate in Dutch and Candidate in French. The years spent to obtain the degree of Candidate were called Kandidaats or Kandidatuur in Dutch and Candidature in French. Each of those two levels required at least two years (four semesters) of successful study. Licentiates were required to write a thesis (called licentiaatsverhandeling in Dutch and mémoire de licence in French). This candidate-licentiate system is now being replaced by an American-style bachelor-master system. Civil engineer (or Burgerlijk ingenieur in Dutch or Ingénieur civil in French, abbreviated ir.), Doctor of medicine (or Doctor in de geneeskunde in Dutch or Docteur en médecine in French, abbreviated dr. med., until 1992), Physician (or Arts in Dutch or Médecin in French, after 1992), Doctor of law (or Doctor in de rechten in Dutch or Docteur en droit in French, abbreviated dr. iur., until 1972) and Magister (philosophy and theology, abbreviated mag.) were equivalent to Licentiate. Baccalaureus (philosophy and theology, abbreviated bac.) was equivalent to Candidate. The former titles dr. med. and dr. iur. are to be considered as professional doctorates, whereas the title dr., which is the result of third level study and research, is a higher doctorate. The Belgian licentiate was also equivalent to the doctorandus in the Netherlands. At the KU Leuven there used to be a degree Licentiaat-doctorandus in de TEW (Toegepaste Economische Wetenschappen) en in Beleidsinformatica. Apart from the general abbreviation lic., more specific abbreviations, such as LHFW (Licentiaat in de Handels- en Financiële Wetenschappen) and LTH (Licentiaat in de Tandheelkunde) exist.
Study for a Belgian degree is very rigorous. Students in Belgian universities usually spend more than thirty hours a week on their studies, as opposed to the average of fifteen hours at American universities. As a result of this, students in Belgium are able to complete their licentiate or master's degrees in four to five years, as opposed to the usual six at American institutions.

Bolivia 
In Bolivia, a Licenciatura is a professional degree distinct from the Anglo-Saxon Bachelor of Arts or Bachelor in Science, as it requires that the student take more credits for the completion of a professional curricula than those needed in the Anglo-Saxon system. The Licenciatura allows the holder to practice his or her profession in all of Bolivia. The durational requirements to obtain a Licenciatura vary depending on the profession studied, however, most universities require the completion of the curricula within four to five years. Aside from the durational requirements, Bolivian universities also require that all candidates, at the completion of the curricula, complement their studies by writing a thesis or by sitting for an oral examination in which State and University representatives take part by testing the student's professional knowledge and skills.

Brazil 

In Brazil, Licenciatura is a professional degree distinct from the Anglo-Saxon Bachelor of Arts or Bachelor of Science, as it requires students to take more credits for the completion of a professional curriculum than those needed in the Anglo-Saxon system. The Licenciatura degree allows its holder to teach disciplines both in primary and secondary education. Although durational requirements to obtain Licenciatura often depend on the topic studied, most universities require the completion of the curriculum within four to five years. Besides the durational requirements for academic activities, Brazilian universities may also require that degree candidates complement their studies by writing a dissertation and apply for an oral examination. This evaluation is performed by Professors and or Researchers aiming to assess the student's professional knowledge and skills.

For instance, as defined by the Brazilian National Council of Education (Ministry of Education), a Licenciatura modality in Biological Sciences should include, in addition to specific topics of Biology, contents in the areas of Chemistry, Physics and Health, to attend elementary and secondary education. Pedagogical training, in addition to its specificities, should contemplate an overview of the education and the formative processes of the students. It should also emphasize the instrumentation for the teaching of Sciences at the fundamental level and for the teaching of biology at the intermediate level. In some Brazilian universities, Bachelor's degree and Licenciatura can be obtained concomitantly, by simultaneously fulfilling requirements for both the degrees (e.g. the Bachelor's and Licenciatura degrees in Biological Sciences, offered by the Pontifical Catholic University of Minas Gerais, Brazil).

Canada 
While the term licentiate is not generally used by Canadian academic institutions, a Licentiate in Laws (LL.L.) is offered by some Canadian universities for the completion of studies equivalent to a Bachelor of Civil Law.
A licentiate is also offered by the Medical Council of Canada (MCC) upon completion of a series of Medical Council of Canada Qualifying examinations for Canadian and International medical graduates. This licentiate is required to obtain an independent medical practice licence in Canada.

Saint Paul University offers the degree of Licentiate in Philosophy by examination, which may be undertaken within ten years of receiving an MA from the Department of Philosophy at the University of Ottawa. This licentiate, a pontifical degree, qualifies graduates to teach philosophy at a seminary or college. Saint Paul University also offers a Licentiate in Canon Law that enables the recipient to practice as a canon lawyer within the Roman Catholic Church, as well as a Licentiate in Sacred Theology which is part of the baccalaureate, licentiate, and doctorate theological degree course within the Roman Catholic Church.

Regis College, University of Toronto offers the degree of Licentiate in Sacred Theology. It is part of the cycle of baccalaureate, licentiate, doctorate in theological formation in the Roman Catholic Church. It can be earned while studying for a civil master's or doctoral degree. It probably sits in rank between the two levels. See John Paul II's apostolic constitution, Sapientia Christiana.

The Pontifical Institute of Mediaeval Studies at the University of Toronto offers a License in Mediaeval Studies (LMS) as a degree exclusively for postdoctoral students who have already completed a PhD. (The application for the LMS refers to it as a "licentiate" and not as a "license.") The degree is unusual in that licentiates from Pontifical institutions are usually a precursor to a doctorate, and not a post-doctoral achievement.

The Royal Conservatory of Music, Toronto, offers a Licentiate Diploma (LRCM) in Piano Performance. The LRCM is the highest level of The Royal Conservatory Certificate Program. The examination is evaluated as a professional concert performance. Candidates are expected to demonstrate a masterful command of the instrument and communicate an understanding of stylistic characteristics and structural elements of each repertoire selection with interpretive insight and a mature musical personality.

Costa Rica 

In Costa Rica, a licentiate belongs to the second level of education (grade), lower than a master's degree but higher than a bachelor's degree, according to the Office for the Planning of Higher Education, part of the National Council of Rectors. Licentiate is extended to those who have fulfilled the requirements of a university program that has a minimum of 150 and a maximum of 180 course credits (public university programs usually last from four to six years of study) and a minimum duration of 10 lesson cycles of 15 weeks or its equivalent (three or four extra course semesters after the completion of the bachelor's degree).

Students are also required to fulfill the requirements for graduation for each institution, with usually requires writing a thesis in some universities, attending a graduation seminar, or developing a project in order to graduate, and some degrees involve the same credits as a master's degree but not the same level of rigor. This is also the degree conferred to a practicing physician. The degree is not considered terminal, and it is not sufficient to be a rector of a private university.

Denmark and Norway 
The licentiate was formerly awarded in Denmark and Norway, and was roughly equal to the American PhD degree. In Denmark, it has formally been replaced by the PhD degree. The proper doctorates in Denmark are considered higher degrees than the PhD (i.e. higher doctorates).

Dominican Republic 
In the Dominican Republic, a Licenciatura is awarded to students after studies of four to six years. Some universities require students to write a thesis in order to graduate while others have to write a shorter, and less labor-intensive, monograph. The Licenciatura is one of the major University degree previous to doctoral studies.

Finland and Sweden 

In Swedish and Finnish universities, a licentiate's degree, recognised as a pre-doctoral degree, is equal to completion of the coursework and a dissertation which is formally equivalent to half of a doctoral dissertation. In Finland, the extent of licentiate degree is 120 ECTS equivalent and it requires two to three years of full-time research. Its prerequisite is a completed 4-year academic degree at advanced level, such as a Master's degree or a Magister's degree. Licentiate degree holders are officially eligible for independent scientific research in Universities, and entitled to the right to supervise master's and licentiate degree theses.

Until the early 1970s, the degree in Sweden was equivalent to the U.S. PhD requiring four to seven years of study after the Bachelor's (or Master's) degree, and a publicly defended thesis. It was gradually substituted with the "Doctor's exam" in 1969 and was re-instituted as an intermediate level in research training in the 1980s, now requiring only two years of study after Masters graduation. The licentiate's degree is called a filosofie licentiat in Swedish and filosofian lisensiaatti in Finnish (Licentiate of Philosophy), teologie licentiat and teologian lisensiaatti (Licentiate of Theology) etc., depending on the faculty. Furthermore, the requisite degree for a physician's licence is licentiat/lisensiaatti; there is no master's degree. (The degree lääketieteen tohtori, medicine doktor, "Doctor of Medicine" is a traditional professor's degree, or a research doctorate, with licentiate as a prerequisite.)

The Licentiate of Engineering is an intermediate postgraduate degree used only in a few countries, among them Sweden and Finland, and can be seen as an academic step halfway between a Master's and a PhD. In Swedish, it is called Teknologie Licentiat, usually abbreviated as Tekn. Lic., and in Finnish, tekniikan lisensiaatti, abbreviated as TkL. The Licentiate of Engineering corresponds to 120 ECTS credits (80 workweeks (old credits)), or nominally two years of full-time work, whereas a PhD amounts to 240 ECTS credits (160 workweeks (old credits)), or a nominal period of four years of full-time work (one old credit equals one week of full-time studies). However, as a result of the differences in requirements and individual performance, the time to complete a Licentiate of Engineering degree varies. For the thesis, 2–3 peer-refereed articles (or an equivalent monograph) is usually required, and there is no requirement for original research per se. In contrast, a doctoral thesis requires 4–6 articles and must demonstrate original research. The program for a licentiate degree is equivalent to a total of two years of full-time study.

France 

In French universities, a licenciate (licencié(e)) is the holder of a licence, which is a three-year degree, roughly equivalent to a bachelor's degree. There are two kinds of licence: general and professional.

Germany 
In Germany, a person titled Lizentiat (or Lizentiat) holds the equivalent education of a Master's degree or Diplom. Until the 1990s, the degree was offered as a law degree at the Saarland University as a single university degree (Lic.iur.) with a duration varying between five and eight years. For political reasons, this degree was discontinued, mainly because the Staatsexamen (Law degree) became the predominant representation of the mainstream education of a lawyer. The Lizentiat is largely equivalent to the 1. Staatsexamen but, unlike the latter, is assessed by the university, not the state administration. It also allowed specialisation in areas of the law which were either not covered by other legal qualifications, e.g. ecclesiastical law etc., or not covered to the same extent. Other disciplines, such as theology or journalism (FU Berlin), used to offer a Lizentiat qualification instead of a PhD.

Haiti 
In Haiti universities, a licenciate (licencié(e)) is the holder of a licence, which is a four-year degree, equivalent to a bachelor's degree. There are two kinds of licence: general and professional.

The general licence is a diploma issued by a university and authenticated by the national department of education. This authentication confirms the school follows and complies to the national curriculum requirements for a four-year baccalaureat (bachelor's) degree.

The professional licence is a Certificate licence issued by a university and authenticated national Department of education after the licenciate diploma holder submits a final paper research that have been analyzed and graded by a board of professors or faculty jury member from the school.

Hong Kong 
The Hong Kong Special Administrative Region of the People's Republic of China (HKSAR) offers a Licentiate of the Medical Council of Hong Kong (LMCHK). This licentiate is required of non-locally trained doctors in order to register as a medical practitioner in Hong Kong. The LMCHK qualification forms part of the pathway towards registration to practice medicine in Hong Kong for those that graduated from medical schools outside of Hong Kong. The Licentiate Society is an independent, non-profit professional body formed to help candidates with the challenges of attaining the LMCHK.

India 
In India, the Licentiate is a vocational qualification offered by the special vocational boards or professional bodies. These are offered after completion of school education and are somewhat less extensive than a full-fledged university degree. Issuers of the licentiate degree include but are not limited to the Insurance Institute of India, the Institute of Company Secretaries of India, the Association of Mutual Funds of India, and the Diploma Examination Board of the government of Andhra Pradesh.

Licentiate Certified Physician and Surgeon (LCPS) was a recognized medical qualification in India before 1946, when the Bhore Committee effectively made the MBBS the sole entry point into the medical profession in India.

Mexico 

As in many Latin American countries, the licenciatura is a general term denoting the first higher-education degree awarded at universities, varying from 3 to 5 years of study, depending on the field. It is thus an undergraduate degree, and require a licence to practice in the learned profession.

In Mexico, a distinction is made between simply passing all the required courses, just being a graduate (graduado or pasante), and actually obtaining the degree diploma (título profesional). Obtaining the diploma means the student completely concluded his or her studies, and has the right of using the title of Licenciado. Statistics show that historically only about 60% of those graduating actually obtain the diploma. At the same time the diploma is awarded, a professional credential (cédula profesional) may be obtained from the National Directorate of Professions (Dirección General de Profesiones, DGP), which serves as a licence to practice and as a national ID card. Some professions do not require the professional credential, but for others, like medicine, accounting, civil engineering, or social work, it is mandatory by law. The law also establishes penalties for crimes committed regarding the professional practice, including those in which an individual offers professional services without having the proper diploma or licence.

For a number of years, presenting a thesis was the only method to obtain the diploma (título). Nowadays, some universities, like the National Autonomous University of Mexico, may still require the thesis, while others, like the federal institutes of technology, may forgo the thesis in exchange for demonstrating professional experience, research work, or excellent academic grades.

By their nature, some disciplines such as nursing, medicine and law require an intense theoretical background as well as practical training, and so a first university degree in those areas may take longer to complete (up to 6 years). Even after obtaining the diploma, graduates require passing a national exam to finally be awarded the professional licence.

In Mexico, every graduate who obtained a licenciatura diploma is technically and legally a licenciado (abbreviated Lic. before the name). However, it is mostly common to use Lic. for graduates of the social sciences, while more specific titles and prefixes are used for other professionals such as engineer (Ingeniero, Ing.), architect (Arquitecto, Arq.), or biologist (Biólogo, Biol.).

In Mexico, the licenciatura qualifies the recipient to pursue a master's degree (maestría). In exceptional cases, the recipient may apply directly to a doctoral degree (doctorado), in which case the study plan integrates coursework from the master's program, and may take up to five years to complete.

According to the Bologna process in Europe, virtually any licenciado has the equivalent qualifications of a 3-year bachelor's degree. The Mexican licenciatura, however, should never be confused with a more advanced postgraduate degree, such as the Swedish "Licenciate of Technology" (Teknologie Licentiat).

New Zealand 
The Photographic Society of New Zealand awards a licentiateship, Licentiate (LPSNZ), for "proficiency of a high order in
practical photography." This means the applicant must demonstrate sound basic technical ability,
along with good compositional skill, and awareness of lighting. Proficiency implies skill with the
camera and in processing and presenting images. This is the first of three honours available the other two being Associate (APSNZ)and Fellow (FPSNZ).

Nicaragua 
In Nicaragua, a Licenciatura is awarded to students after undergraduate studies ranging between four and six years. Students are required to write a thesis if studying in the liberal arts, law or science in order to graduate. Students in engineering typically complete modulos, which are additional post-degree requirements before graduating. Additionally, there are Nicaraguan universities that require an internship (internado or pasantia) prior to graduation. The Licenciatura is the degree that segues candidates into both masters and/or PhD programs.

Panama 
This degree is awarded upon completion of four years of study in a specific field of study – e.g., Licenciatura de Docencia en ingles (Licentiate in Teaching of English), and qualifies the recipient to pursue a master's degree.  In order to be able to teach at university level, the recipient of a licentiate must complete the Posgrado de Docencia Superior (Postgraduate of Tertiary Education), that may be obtained before or after a master's degree.

Peru 
The Bachelor of Arts and the Bachelor of Science in the Anglo-Saxon universities are awarded upon completion of studies. In Peru, "Bachiller" is also awarded automatically for having completed all the courses required for obtaining the first academic degree. In Perú, A "Bachiller" degree is the first academic degree and allows one to enroll in a master's degree course. The master's degree is the second degree and it allows you to get a Doctor's degree (equivalent to a PhD).

The "Licenciatura" in Peru is not considered an academic degree, but rather a "Professional Title" within a specific profession which allows you to work in positions outside academia and perform as an independent professional in the Republic of Peru. Most professions require the "Licenciatura" or "Professional Title" to be able to register with professional association or society (Colegio Profesional). To obtain a "Licenciatura" it is required to either pass an additional test or defend a thesis. Although most Bachelor courses in Peru require to complete "Thesis work" or "Thesis seminars" modules(usually developing a research project during the last two semesters of the course) to obtain the degree, it is not mandatory to defend it. To obtain a "Licenciatura" or "Título Profesional" the student is required to write a thesis (usually that developed during their bachelor course), and pass their viva voce. Alternatively, it is possible to complete a written exam and then an oral examination in front of a group of professors (who are registered in the professional college/body of that specific profession). With this last option, it is usually required to have at least one year of professional experience in the relevant field of studies. Therefore, for some professions which used to be called "carreras largas" or long careers (e.g. dentistry, law, psychology and medicine), the student requires more than five years of studies or ten semesters to become a member of a professional body.

Nowadays, some universities do not use the word Licenciado or Licenciada as a prefix before the professional title, e.g. Licenciado/a en Farmacia y Bioquímica (Licentiate in Pharmacy and Biochemistry) in their certificates. Instead they use Químico Farmacéutico, the same happens in with the other professions (i.e. Enfermero, Ingeniero, Psicólogo.) In such cases, both written titles are equivalent. The Professional Titles in Peru are equivalent to the professional degrees in the Anglo-Saxon countries, therefore if a person obtained a Master in Counselling degree in the US will need to complete the university studies in Peru in order to obtain the Licenciate or Title of Psychologist and then the Licensure at the Colegio de Psicólogos del Perú. In Perú the Professional Title of Psicólogo is similar to the Psy.D. in the Anglo-Saxon degree.

Poland 
A licencjat is a degree that was introduced in Poland by the tertiary education reforms. The purpose of these reforms was to bring the Polish university system into line with the Bologna system. It is typically a three- or four-year degree, equivalent to the bachelor's degree in Anglo-Saxon countries. Students completing a licencjat often go on to complete a magister'''s degree.
In theology faculties which use Vatican-regulated degrees, licencjat is a degree between that of master and doctor.

 Portugal 
Due to the developments introduced by the Bologna Process in the mid-2000s, in Portugal the licentiate's degree (Licenciatura) may refer to both old and new Licenciaturas, which were awarded before and after the Bologna's reforms, respectively. The length of the old Licenciatura programs would range from four to six years and are now equivalent to the new Master's degrees. In the past, a master's degree would add 2 more years to the 4 to 6 years of the old undergraduate Licenciatura programs, thus taking 6 to 8 years of post-secondary education to obtain a master's degree. The new Licenciatura degrees that are now being awarded in Portugal and in almost all Europe with varying local designations, are usually three-year programs.

Since 2006, in the Portuguese higher education system, Licenciatura is the first degree awarded by institutions of higher education. It is also the first degree used in the European Higher Education Area, and is also designated a Bachelor's degree in other European countries. The Master's degree entails a two-year program of study, in which students can normally enroll after completing a licentiate's degree, and provides higher qualification for employment (e.g., for Architecture or Medicine a Master's is required, as well as for some Engineering branches, entailing a total of 5 to 6 years of post-secondary studies) or to prepare a student for his or her PhD research or work permit from the regulatory and licensing body for profession in Portugal.

 Romania 
In Romania, before the Bologna process, a licence (Rom. licenţă) was an academic degree awarded after four to six years of study, finalised by a thesis. It was a degree higher than the graduate diploma obtained after three years of study, which was mostly used in pedagogical institutes that trained secondary education teachers, and was considered inferior to the doctorate. A Romanian licence was the equivalent of a French maîtrise or a German Diplom. There are some Romanian licences (obtained before the Bologna process was of application) which have been recognized as meester (mr.) and doctorandus (drs.) in the Netherlands, i.e. at the LLM and MA level. Now, after the Bologna process, the Romanian licence is similar to a Bachelor's degree.

 Serbia 
In Serbia and rest of former Yugoslavia region, the name of the degree was magistar, which was awarded after one year of postgraduate studies and finishing the magistar thesis on a scientific subject. The basic graduate studies was four years before that. Accepting the Bolognia process, Serbia changed its academic degrees and the names of degrees were synchronized with other western school systems. Basically, there are 3 levels of studies now: 1. bachelor, 2. master and 3. PhD (Ser. doktorske), but also there are two semi-levels of specialization. Between 1st and 2nd level are professional master's degree studies (Ser. specijalističke strukovne studije) and between 2nd and 3rd level are academic specialist studies (Ser. specijalističke akademske studije). That studies between 2nd and 3rd level of education are equal to licentiate level. It is formally at the 2nd level of academic studies with the master studies (at the same level). As a professional degree, when ranking employees, it is on 3rd level, together with PhD studies.

The main purpose for having such a semi-level is to enable students, who cannot finish PhD studies but reached certain significant level of additional knowledge (around first half of PhD studies), to get certificate about finishing one stage of the PhD studies and continue those studies later in life. To get to the specialist level, it is needed first to pass master's degree, then study for a year, after which the candidate need to defend the final specialist academic thesis which is a document describing a research in the scientific and professional area, winning additional 60 ECTS for overall study.

 Spain 
In Spain, the Licenciatura degree was one of the major higher-education degrees previous to doctoral studies, and is equivalent to a bachelor's degree and a master's degree in the anglophone system. This degree is currently being phased out at Spanish universities, replaced by the 'Grado' (Bachelor) and 'Master' system due to the implementation of the Bologna Declaration on the European higher education area.

The Licenciatura academic degree is academically equivalent to the Ingeniero or Arquitecto degrees. A Licenciatura typically required from four to six years of university courses, and had a typical credit workload of 300 to 400 credits. It usually had two or three introductory years (first cycle, after which the candidate could obtain a Diplomatura or Bachelor's degree in that field of studies) and two additional years (second cycle) for specialization (but this could vary from one to three). In addition, there existed a third cycle, comprising PhD degrees (doctorado, which included one or two years of research oriented courses and the completion of a thesis towards the same doctor diploma). When studying for a Licenciatura, completion of the first cycle did not automatically lead to the award of a diploma. However, students could elect to study specialized three-year degrees from the outset (diplomaturas, and arquitecturas técnicas—technical engineering), which, after successful completion, would give access to the second cycle of a number of Licenciaturas. A Licenciatura degree also provided direct access to professional practice or membership in professional associations such as Bar Associations for lawyers (Colegio de Abogados, until Bar membership requirements were changed to include a minimum amount of legal work experience and passing an exam), medicine, economics, and other regulated professions.

The third cycle was sometimes called postgrado. Note, however, that the label "undergraduate" may be misleading to an anglophone audience, since while a Spanish Diplomatura may be likened to an undergraduate Bachelor's degree, a Spanish Licenciatura is comparable in scope to a postgraduate Master's degree, as the anglophone distinction between "undergraduate" and "postgraduate" degrees does not properly apply to the traditional higher-education system of Spain. Many Spanish licenciados, when translating their CVs into English, use the formula BA+MA (or BSc+MSc) to indicate that a Licenciatura is equivalent to a master's degree. Depending on the degree and study plan, some Spanish universities require a small thesis or research project to be submitted in the last year before the student can finally claim his or her degree.

The Spanish government issued a royal decree in 2014 establishing the official equivalences between the Spanish pre-Bologna titles and the European Qualifications Framework (EQF) levels. This royal decree also describes the procedure for applying for a personal certificate stating the equivalence of a given pre-Bologna title to the new Bologna levels. Most Licenciaturas (if not all) have been placed in level 7 (Master) of the EQF.

After the Bologna process, all official university degrees will fall into one of these three categories: Grado (Bachelor), Master or Doctor. Most Grados will consist of three or four years (240 ECTS credits), unless it is otherwise ruled by an EU Directive (like Pharmacy, five years, or Medicine, six years). All university students completing these four years will get a Grado and may then go on with Master's studies (one to two years, 60-120 ECTS credits). Doctorate studies will in most cases require a research-oriented master's degree and may or may not include specific courses.Grados will take one year more than the old Diplomatura or Ingeniería Técnica degrees, and graduates from the old system may have to study additional courses to transform their degree into a Grado. Nevertheless, in most aspects, Grados will be the equivalent of the old intermediate degrees: Grado engineers will have the responsibilities of former Ingenieros técnicos. Lawyers will need a master's degree, not a Grado. And in public service, Grado holders will by default be in the A2 level (the second highest), while A1 (the highest) will be for Grado holders with additional requirements (such as a master's or a doctorate, or a special Grado such as Medicine that is in many aspects equivalent to a master's).

Prior to the Bologna process, the master's degree was not considered an official academic degree in Spain, as the transition from undergraduate to postgraduate studies could only be done directly from a Licenciatura to doctoral studies.

 Switzerland 
At Swiss universities, until the adoption of the Bologna Convention, the Lizentiat/licence was the equivalent of a master's degree (there being no prior degrees) and qualified the holder for doctoral studies. The degree names are followed by the field of study (e.g. lic. phil., lic. ès lettres, lic. oec., etc.). In line with the Bologna Process, the degree has now been replaced by master's degrees (with bachelor's degrees being newly introduced).
According to the Swiss University Conference, the joint organization of the cantons and the Confederation for university politics, and the Rectors' Conference of the Swiss Universities, the old Lizentiat/licence is considered equivalent to the current master's degree.

ETH Zurich stated that they consider the Swiss licenciate as equivalent to a master's degree, though they state it is not the same.

 United Kingdom 
The University of Wales, Lampeter offers Licences in Latin and Greek. They are postgraduate diplomas – meaning that the student would normally have completed a (typically three-year) bachelor's degree course first – and can be completed in either two or three years.

The City and Guilds of London Institute Licentiateship is awarded to those who achieve a level 4 Professional Recognition Award. Trinity College London formerly awarded licentiates, which were accredited at Level 6 of the Regulated Qualifications Framework (RQF).
The Landscape Institute offers licentiate membership to those who have completed a bachelor's degree and a postgraduate diploma in the field of landscape architecture.

The College of Teachers also offers a licentiateship. This program, which is offered at the degree level, is for individuals with a BEd (three-year program) who wishes to do in-service advanced training in education or a related learning field. Also in education, Trinity College London awards the Licentiate Diploma in TESOL, commonly referred to as the Dip TESOL, an advanced teaching qualification in ESL at Level 7 of the NQF.

The Institute of Heraldic and Genealogical Studies, based in Canterbury, Kent, has as its highest qualification (above Certificate, Higher Certificate and Diploma levels) the Licentiateship of the institute, awarded following both a course of study including thesis and dissertation and professional practice.

In music, a licentiate is the qualification which follows the diploma and is offered by Trinity College London (LTCL), Associated Board of the Royal Schools of Music (LRSM) and London College of Music (LLCM); candidates may choose to specialize in performance or teaching, depending on the examination board.

 Venezuela 
A Licenciatura'' is awarded to students after five years of study. They are required to write a thesis and/or do an intership and/or develop a research project in order to graduate.

Pontifical universities and faculties 

The licentiate degree is a post-graduate, research degree, considered above the master's degree and below the research doctoral degree, conferred by authority of the Holy See by a pontifical university or ecclesiastical faculty upon completion of studies in one of the sacred sciences. The pontifical licentiate is a canonical pre-requisite for entrance into a pontifical doctoral program:  "Nobody can be admitted to the doctorate unless first having obtained the licentiate." The licentiate may be conferred in any of the sacred sciences, including theology, philosophy or canon law, such as, the Licentiate of Canon Law (JCL), the Licentiate of Sacred Theology (STL), or the Licentiate of Philosophy (PhL). Pontifical universities and Catholic Universities with Ecclesiastical Faculties such as the Pontifical Lateran University, Pontifical Gregorian University, Pontifical University of the Holy Cross, Pontifical Athenaeum of Sant'Anselmo, Pontifical Salesian University, Pontifical University of Antonianum, Pontifical University of Saint Thomas Aquinas, Angelicum in Rome, the Pontifical University of Salamanca in Spain, the Pontifical and Royal University of Santo Tomas in Manila (Philippines), The Catholic University of America in Washington, DC, University of Saint Mary of the Lake in Mundelein, IL, and Regis College in Toronto, Canada all confer such degrees.  The Pontifical Institute of Mediaeval Studies in Toronto awards a licentiate in Mediaeval studies, but, unusually, only offers it as a postdoctoral degree.  (Cf. the Canada section above.) Further, the licentiate degree also grants the holder the "licence" to teach at any Catholic university, seminary or pontifical faculty anywhere around the world.

Heraldry 
In Canada, anyone who completes the Level III Heraldic Proficiency Courses is granted the right to use the post-nominal of LRHSC (Licentiate of the Royal Heraldry Society of Canada). This is awarded by the Royal Heraldry Society of Canada.

Medicine, surgery and obstetrics

Canada 
A medical graduate must obtain the qualification of Licentiate of the Medical Council of Canada from the Medical Council of Canada before they are eligible to apply for licensure in the province or territory concerned.

Great Britain 
 Licentiate of the Royal College of Physicians (LRCP) is awarded by the Royal College of Physicians of London.
 Licentiate of the Royal College of Surgeons (LRCS), previously Member of the Royal College of Surgeons (MRCS) is awarded by the Royal College of Surgeons of England.
 Licentiate in Medicine and Surgery of the Society of Apothecaries (LMSSA) is awarded by the Worshipful Society of Apothecaries of London.
 Licentiate of the Royal College of Physicians of Edinburgh (LRCPE) is awarded by the Royal College of Physicians of Edinburgh.
 Licentiate of the Royal College of Surgeons of Edinburgh (LRCSE) is awarded by the Royal College of Surgeons of Edinburgh.
 Licentiate of the Royal College of Physicians and Surgeons of Glasgow (LRCPSG) is awarded by the Royal College of Physicians and Surgeons of Glasgow.

These Conjoint diplomas were latterly awarded by the United Examining Board. The first two, and latterly the first three, were granted together in England, and the last three in Scotland, until 1999, after which approval to hold the examinations was withdrawn. The qualifications are still registrable with the General Medical Council, and allow the bearer to practice medicine in the United Kingdom, and used to be recognised by some state medical boards in the United States.

The Licentiate of Apothecaries' Hall (LAH) was a similar qualifying medical diploma awarded externally in Dublin until recognition was lost in 1968.

These licentiate diplomas were awarded by professional bodies, and were accepted by the General Medical Council for registration as a medical practitioner, but were not university degrees and were regarded as being at a slightly lower level than bachelor's degrees in medicine.

Finland 
In Finland, licensed medical practitioners (physicians and surgeons) are either licentiates or doctorates, where the Licentiate of Medicine is the minimum qualification. In terms of degree coursework, the licentiate is above master's but below a doctorate. In the medical field, there is no master's degree, and the bachelor's degree qualifies only for practical training to become a licentiate. Qualified licentiates may continue studies to become a Doctor of Medicine if they want to work in research.

Hong Kong 

Medical graduates from schools outside of Hong Kong must obtain a medical license directly form the Medical Council of Hong Kong before they are able to register to practice medicine in Hong Kong.  The qualification is known as the Licentiate of the Medical Council of Hong Kong (LMCHK). The LMCHK is awarded after such doctors undergo careful vetting, passing the HKMLE exam, and completing a period of assessment. The licentiate doctors are represented by an independent, non-profit professional body, known as the Licentiate Society.

Ireland 
In Dublin, students at the School of Medicine of the Royal College of Surgeons in Ireland still qualify with licentiate diplomas from the two Irish Royal Colleges, coupled with a Licence in Midwifery from each, although in the past few years they have also been awarded the three medical bachelor's degrees of the National University of Ireland:
 Licentiate of the Royal College of Physicians of Ireland (LRCPI) or (L & LM, RCPI) and
 Licentiate of the Royal College of Surgeons in Ireland (LRCSI) or (L & LM, RCSI).

Certain maternity hospitals in Dublin used to award a Licentiate in Midwifery or LM diploma, not to midwives but to qualified medical practitioners who had been examined there after a three-month residential appointment. The Rotunda Hospital was the most recent to do so.
 Licenciate of the Royal Academy of Music is awarded by the Royal Academy of Music.
 Licentiate Member of the Institute of Clerks of Works and Construction Inspectorate (post nominal LICWCI) is a professional grade of the Institute of Clerks of Works and Construction Inspectorate, the professional body that supports quality construction and compliance of building standards through inspection.
 Licentiate of the Chartered Institute of Personnel and Development is a part qualified professional grade of the Chartered Institute of Personnel & Development (CIPD). Prior to the Institute gaining its Royal Charter, members at this grade were able to use the post nominal Lic IPD after their names.

Theology, canon law, history, and cultural patrimony 

The degree of Licentiate of Theology (LTh) is a theological qualification commonly awarded for ordinands and laymen studying theology in the United Kingdom, Malta, Canada, Australia and New Zealand.

A qualification similar to the LTh is the two-year postgraduate Licentiate of Sacred Theology (SThL), available from many Pontifical universities and Pontifical faculties of theology, possessing the authority to grant Pontifical degrees. This compares with, for example in North American institutions, the four-year program for a B.A. at many universities, a two-year program for an MA, and the writing and successful defense of the doctoral dissertation for the PhD, Th.D., or SThD (an additional two to three years).

The degree of Licentiate of Canon Law (JCL) is similarly awarded at Pontifical universities and faculties. Other qualifications for canon law include an inter-denominational LLM program at least one university (Cardiff), though this degree would not have canonical effects in the Roman Catholic Church.

The Faculty of the History and the Cultural Patrimony of the Church at the Gregorian University also awards the Licentiate in the History of the Church, and the Licentiate in the Cultural Patrimony of the Church.

Bologna Process 
In 2003, the European Union organized the Bologna Convention for the European Higher Education Area under the Lisbon Recognition Convention, more commonly known as the Bologna Process, in order to create uniform standards across the European Union in university education. The resulting conclusions called for all European universities to change their degree programs to a bachelor's degree and a master's degree.

See also 
 All but dissertation
 Doctor of Philosophy
 Graduate degree
 Master's degree
 Undergraduate degree

References 

Academic degrees
Education in Switzerland